Zbyszko  is an old Polish name of Slavic origin, derived from diminutive form of names e.g. Zbigniew, Zbysław, Zbylut, etc. 

Notable people with the name include:

Stanislaus Zbyszko, strongman and professional wrestler prominent in the United States during the 1920s
Larry Zbyszko, professional wrestler known for his feud with wrestling legend Bruno Sammartino
Wladek Zbyszko, professional wrestler and strongman, brother of Stanislaus Zbyszko

See also
Zbigniew
Zbylut (given name)

Polish masculine given names
Slavic masculine given names
Masculine given names